The 2018–19 Senior Women's One Day League was the 13th edition of the women's List A cricket competition in India. It was played from 1 December 2018 to 31 December 2018 in a round-robin format, with 36 teams were divided in 4 groups. Bengal won the tournament, beating Andhra in the final by 10 runs. Himachal Pradesh and Odisha gained promotion from Elite Group C, whilst Uttarakhand gained promotion from the Plate Group.

The tournament's scheduling conflict with Ranji Trophy led to a shortage of umpire and match officials. The knockouts for the competition were therefore delayed and moved from December 24–29 to December 26–31.

Competition format
The 36 teams competing in the tournament were divided into the Elite Group and the Plate Group, with the 27 teams in the Elite Group further divided into Groups A, B and C and the 10 remained teams competing in one Plate Group. The tournament operated on a round-robin format, with each team playing every other team in their group once. At the end of the group stage, the Elite Group A and Elite Group B tables were combined, with the top five in the combined table progressing to the quarter-finals, joined by the top two teams from Elite Group C and the top team from the Plate Group. The top two teams from Elite Group C were also promoted to Elite Group A/B for the following season, with the bottom two teams from the combined table relegated. The winner of the Plate Group was also promoted, with the bottom team from Elite Group C relegated. Matches were played using a 50 over format.

The groups worked on a points system with positions with the groups being based on the total points. Points were awarded as follows:

Win: 4 points. 
Tie: 2 points. 
Loss: 0 points. 
No Result/Abandoned: 2 points.

If points in the final table are equal, teams are separated by most wins, then head-to-head record, then Net Run Rate.

League stage

Points tables

Elite Group A/B Combined Table

Elite Group C

Plate Group

Fixtures

Elite Group A

Elite Group B

Elite Group C

Plate Group

Knockout stage

Quarter-finals

Semi-finals

Final

Statistics

Most runs

Source: CricketArchive

Most wickets

Source: CricketArchive

References

Women's Senior One Day Trophy
Senior Women's One Day League
Senior Women's One Day League